Harold Gregg Lewis (May 9, 1914 – January 25, 1992) was an American economist notable for his contributions in labor economics. He was considered a principal member of the monetarist, free-market-oriented Chicago school of economics.

A native of Homer, Michigan, Lewis earned his bachelor's degree and Ph.D. from the University of Chicago. He stayed as a faculty member until 1975, when he moved to Duke University.

References

External links 
 

1914 births
1992 deaths
Labor economists
20th-century American economists
University of Chicago alumni
University of Chicago faculty
Duke University faculty
Distinguished Fellows of the American Economic Association